Caroline Stilwell Axel Burckle (born June 24, 1986) is an American former competition swimmer and Olympic bronze medalist.

Early years 

Burckle was born in Louisville, Kentucky. She attended Sacred Heart Academy in Louisville, and graduated in 2004.

College career 

Burckle accepted an athletic scholarship to attend the University of Florida in Gainesville, Florida, where she swam for coach Gregg Troy's Florida Gators swimming and diving team in National Collegiate Athletic Association (NCAA) and Southeastern Conference (SEC) competition from 2005 to 2008. She won two NCAA individual championships in the 200- and 500-yard freestyle event in 2008, and was named the 2008 NCAA Female Swimmer of the Year by virtue of winning two NCAA national championships and breaking the oldest-standing women's NCAA swimming record by swimming a 4:33.60 in the 500-yard freestyle.

She also won SEC individual championships in the 200-yard freestyle (2005), the 500-yard freestyle (2005, 2008), the 100-yard breaststroke (2007), and the 200-yard breaststroke (2008), and three more SEC titles as a member of the Gators' winning relay teams in the 4x100-yard medley relay (2005), the 4x200-yard freestyle relay (2005), and the 4x50-yard medley relay (2008). During her four-year college career, she received twenty-three All-American honors. She was the 2007–08 recipient of the Honda Sports Award for Swimming and Diving, recognizing her as the outstanding college female swimmer. She graduated from the University of Florida with a bachelor's degree in sociology in 2009.

Burckle's younger brother Clark also swam for Florida, but transferred to the University of Arizona before his senior year, and was an individual NCAA champion in the 200-yard breaststroke in 2010.

International career 

In 2005, Burckle was selected to compete at the World Championships in Montreal.  She swam in the preliminaries of the 4×200-meter freestyle relay for the gold-medal-winning U.S. team.  At the 2007 Pan American Games in Rio de Janeiro, Burckle won the gold medal in the 800-meter freestyle.

At the 2008 U.S. Olympic Team Trials in Omaha, Nebraska, Burckle placed fourth in the 200-meter freestyle, earning a place on the Olympic swim team for the 4×200-meter freestyle relay. Burckle also placed fourth in the 400-meter freestyle and fifth in the 800-meter freestyle in Omaha.

At the 2008 Olympic Games, Burckle earned a bronze medal swimming in the 4×200-meter freestyle relay.  Burckle swam the lead-off leg in the preliminary heats in 1:57.86, and was selected to swim in the final.  She swam the third leg of the final in 1:56.70.

At the 2009 National Championships, Burckle placed third in the 400-meter freestyle, barely missing the chance to compete at the 2009 World Championships. Burckle was, however, named to the 2009–2010 U.S. National Team.

In the fall of 2009, Burckle moved to Fullerton, California to train with the FAST Swim Team under coach Sean Hutchison. She retired from competition swimming in 2010.

Personal bests

Life after competition swimming 

After her move to Southern California in 2009, Burckle enrolled at the Fashion Institute of Design & Merchandising.  She completed a degree in merchandise product development in 2010.  In 2011, Burckle briefly relocated to San Diego to work for Montiel USA, a start-up women's "active wear" line.

In late 2011, Burckle returned to Louisville to begin Stilwellness, a health and wellness coaching business.  Burckle is a member of the International Coaching Federation and Ohio Valley Professional Coaching Alliance, and is pursuing a degree from Wellcoaches School.

See also 

 Florida Gators
 List of Olympic medalists in swimming (women)
 List of University of Florida alumni
 List of University of Florida Olympians

References

External links 
 
 
 
 
 
 
 

1986 births
Living people
American female freestyle swimmers
Florida Gators women's swimmers
Olympic bronze medalists for the United States in swimming
Pan American Games gold medalists for the United States
Sacred Heart Academy (Louisville) alumni
Sportspeople from Louisville, Kentucky
Swimmers at the 2007 Pan American Games
Swimmers at the 2008 Summer Olympics
Medalists at the 2008 Summer Olympics
World Aquatics Championships medalists in swimming
Pan American Games medalists in swimming
Medalists at the 2007 Pan American Games